James Hoey Craigie TD FRIBA (7 May 1870 – 30 March 1930) was a Scottish architect. He studied at the Glasgow School of Art. In 1894 he won the Alexander Thomson travelling scholarship which he spent in France and Italy. In 1905 he was made a partner in the firm Clarke & Bell, its name changing to Clarke & Bell & J H Craigie.

Significant works

Craigie's significant work includes the domed roof and restaurant additions to the Grosvenor Building, 72–80 Gordon Street (1902–07); Art Nouveau remodelling of early 19th century tenement, 186–188 Argyle Street (1908); the reconstruction of the Justiciary Buildings in Glasgow (1910–13); Corona Bar, Langside (1912–13); and St Mary's Parish Church, Kirkintilloch (1912–14).

He worked closely with Frederick Marquis (later Lord Woolton) who subsequently became Managing Director of Lewis's. They were most thorough in their planning and Craigie and Marquis toured the country inspecting all department stores with the object of ensuring that the new store would embrace everything that was good in its construction. They visited London, Liverpool, Manchester and Birmingham and incorporated all the knowledge acquired into the plans for the Glasgow Store. Craigie's biggest difficulty was to find a sure method of keeping the River Clyde out of the basement.

Military service

Craigie served as a captain in the Royal Engineers during the First World War, holding a commission in the 7th Battalion of the Highland Light Infantry from 1908, and was awarded the Territorial Decoration in 1917.

Personal life
Craigie was a member of Cathcart Parish Council from 1913 and was its chairman in 1922–23. He was married three times, and had four children with his second wife. He died of liver cancer on 30 March 1930.

References

External links 
 Imperial War Museum: Lives of the First World War

20th-century Scottish architects
Architects from Glasgow
Alumni of the Glasgow School of Art
Deaths from cancer in Scotland
Deaths from liver cancer
1870 births
1930 deaths
Art Nouveau architects
Fellows of the Royal Institute of British Architects
Royal Engineers officers
Highland Light Infantry officers
British Army personnel of World War I